This list of tallest buildings in Beijing ranks skyscrapers in Beijing by height. The third tallest building as of 2020 is China World Trade Center Phase 3B at 295.6 metres (970 ft). Currently there are 63 buildings taller than 150 meters in Beijing.

History 
The history of skyscrapers in Beijing began in 1959 with the completion of the Minzu Hotel. Beijing's skyline gradually expanded upward at a modest rate for three decades. The completion of the China World Trade Center Tower 1 in 1989 marked the beginning of Beijing's first building boom that lasted ten years. Many of the skyscrapers completed during both building booms are located in Chaoyang District, including the Beijing TV Centre, Park Tower and Fortune Plaza Office Building 1, all of which served as the tallest building in the city for a time. In December 2008, the number of completed highrise buildings were increased to 895 in Beijing.

The skyscraper is not a traditional tower, but a continuous loop of five horizontal and vertical sections, creating an irregular grid on the building’s facade with an open center. With  of office space, the skyscraper is the largest office building in China and the second-largest in the world, after the Pentagon. In December 2008, there were 45 projects under construction and proposed in Beijing.

Tallest buildings

This lists ranks Beijing skyscrapers that stand at least 120 m (394 ft) tall, based on standard height measurement. This includes spires and architectural details but does not include antenna masts. Existing structures are included for ranking purposes based on present height.

* Indicates still under construction, but has been topped out.

Tallest under construction and proposed

This lists skyscrapers that are under construction and proposed in Beijing and planned to rise over 120 m (394 ft), but are not yet completed structures.

*Table entries without text indicate that information regarding floor count or dates of completion has not yet been released.

Timeline of tallest buildings

This is a list of buildings that in the past held the title of tallest building in Beijing.

Notes
A. The Central Radio & TV Tower is not a habitable building, but is included in this list for comparative purposes. Per a ruling by the Council on Tall Buildings and Urban Habitat, freestanding TV towers are not considered to be buildings, as they are not fully habitable structures, although one could reside there its function is not office or residential.

References
General

Specific

External links
 Beijing buildings on SkyscraperPage
 Skyscrapers of Beijing on Gaoloumi (in Chinese)

Beijing
Tallest buildings
Buildings and structures in Beijing